Sinclair Bros. were a short lived Australian musical duo, consisting of brothers Wayne and John Sinclair. The duo released one studio album in 1979.

Discography

Albums

Singles

References

Pop music duos
Rock music duos
Sibling musical duos
Australian pop music groups
Musical groups established in 1978
Musical groups disestablished in 1980